The black-and-chestnut warbling finch (Poospiza whitii) is a species of bird in the tanager family Thraupidae. It is found on the slopes of the Andes in western Argentina and western Bolivia. Its natural habitats are woodland borders and hedgerows.

Taxonomy

The black-and-chestnut warbling finch was formally described in 1883 by the English zoologist Philip Sclater under the current binomial name Poospiza whitii. The specific epithet was chosen to honour Ernest William White who had collected the specimen. The type locality is Cosquín, Córdoba in Argentina.

This species was formerly considered conspecific with the black-and-rufous warbling finch. The taxa were split based on molecular genetic and phenotypic data. The species is monotypic: no subspecies are recognised.

References

Black-and-chestnut warbling finch
Birds of Argentina
Birds of Bolivia
black-and-chestnut warbling finch
black-and-chestnut warbling finch